The Eklutna Power Plant, also referred to as Old Eklutna Power Plant, is a historic hydroelectric power plant on the Eklutna River in Anchorage, Alaska. The facilities include two dams, a tunnel and penstock, and a powerhouse. The main dam, Eklutna Dam, located at the northwestern end of Eklutna Lake, was built in 1941 to replace a series of temporary structures built after an earthen dam failed before the plant began operation. The powerhouse is a concrete-and-steel structure completed in 1929. The diversion dam removal was completed in 2018 to allow for the passage of salmon.

The power plant was listed on the National Register of Historic Places in 1980.

See also

National Register of Historic Places listings in Anchorage, Alaska

References

External links
 

1929 establishments in Alaska
Buildings and structures completed in 1929
Hydroelectric power plants in Alaska
Industrial buildings and structures on the National Register of Historic Places in Alaska
Energy infrastructure on the National Register of Historic Places
Buildings and structures on the National Register of Historic Places in Anchorage, Alaska